Space Channel 5 is a music video game developed by Sega AM9 and published by parent company Sega. Originally released for the Dreamcast (1999 in Japan, 2000 worldwide), it was later ported to the PlayStation 2 (2002 in Europe, 2003 in Japan and North America). A version for the Game Boy Advance (GBA) was published in 2003 as a Western exclusive. Following space-faring reporter Ulala as she investigates an alien invasion, players engage in rhythm-based combat where Ulala mimics the actions of rivals in time to musical tracks.

The game was conceived by Tetsuya Mizuguchi, who was told to create something aimed at a female audience. Production lasted two years, with a staff of around 20 that included company veterans and newcomers to game development. The music, composed by Naofumi Hataya and Kenichi Tokoi, drew inspiration from big band music. Ken Woodman's "Mexican Flyer" had informed the musical style and acted as the theme song. The overall style was influenced by culture from the 1950s and 1960s, and the later music videos of Peter Gabriel and Michael Jackson, the latter having a cameo appearance in the game.

While the game released to low sales, journalists gave the Dreamcast original generally positive reviews; praise focused on its music-central gameplay and artstyle, but faulted its short length and syncing issues with the graphics. The PS2 version met with similar praise, with many recommending it due to the low selling price. The GBA version, titled Ulala's Cosmic Attack, saw lower scores due to technical shortcomings. The game has since spawned a series of related games and media, beginning with the sequel Space Channel 5: Part 2, released in 2002 in Japan and 2003 worldwide.

Synopsis and gameplay

In the music video game Space Channel 5, players take on the role of Ulala, a reporter working for the titular news channel in a 1960s-styled science fiction future filled with competing news channels. When an alien race called the Morolians begin attacking, Ulala simultaneously reports on the events, fights off the threat, and clashes with rival reporters. The invasion is revealed to have been staged by Space Channel 5 boss Chief Blank to drive up ratings for the channel. With help from fellow reporters and support from her fans, Ulala defeats Blank.

Players control Ulala through four stages; real-time polygonal character models and visual effects move in synch to MPEG movies which form the level backgrounds. All gameplay has Ulala mimicking the movements and vocalisations of her opponents (compared by journalists to the game Simon Says). Actions are performed in time to music tracks playing in each section of a stage. There are six buttons that match actions on-screen; the directional pad buttons, and two action buttons (A and B on Dreamcast and Game Boy Advance (GBA), Cross and Circle on PlayStation 2) which are presented with the vocalization "chu".

Levels are split between "dance" areas, and shooting areas. During dance sections, Ulala mimics actions and shouts of "chu" from enemies, with successful actions boosting a "Ratings" meter in the lower right corner of the screen. In combat, Ulala must shoot at and defeat enemies, and also rescue hostages with the other action button. After either a dance or combat section, Ulala is joined in her progress by the people she rescued. During boss battles, Ulala has a health meter represented on-screen as hearts; a heart is lost for each mistake. If Ulala makes too many mistakes and loses all hearts during boss battles, or fails to meet the minimum rating requirements or causes ratings to drop to zero by missing or failing actions, the player reaches a game over and must restart. The game features a new game plus option, where players can begin a new game using a completed save file. Depending on current rating, alternate routes are unlocked and new enemy patterns appear.

Development

The concept for Space Channel 5 originated when Tetsuya Mizuguchi—then known for his work on racing games—was contacted by Sega to develop a game for the Dreamcast aimed at a female casual gaming demographic. Mizuguchi had no knowledge of such a demographic, so he personally interviewed several young girls to find their tastes in gaming. He discovered that, while male gamers trended towards games that allowed for ranking and high scores, women preferred straight puzzle games. Mizuguchi decided to create a game which would bring together both video game and music fans, using his personal experience with nightclub disco and music events such as Street Parade. He also drew inspiration from the art of Wassily Kandinsky, wanting to encourage a form of synesthesia within players. Other sources of inspiration were the music of the 1950s and 60s, and the music videos of Peter Gabriel and Michael Jackson that were showing on MTV during the 80s. This concept originated in 1993, with full production beginning in 1998 following extensive internal planning and approval by Sega senior staff.

Production was handled by Sega AM9, later known as United Game Artists. The team included many staff from Team Andromeda (makers of Panzer Dragoon) and the Sonic the Hedgehog series, and more who were complete newcomers to game development. Development for the game lasted almost two years. Beginning with a small team of ten, it eventually expanded to 27 members as development progressed. Mizuguchi acted as the game's producer, with Takashi Yuda both directing and providing the voice for supporting character Fuze. The game was Mizuguchi's first time working on a game aimed exclusively at the home console market, as his earlier work had first been developed for arcade. Speaking about the Dreamcast, Mizuguchi said that it allowed higher-quality music compared to graphics-focused racing games. He wanted to use the new technology to incorporate interactivity into the score. Production was challenging at times due to the balance of gameplay and scenario.

Design
The earliest versions of the game were described by Mizuguchi as "very cool, but not so fun", as players simply pressed buttons in time to the music while a non-interactive video changed. To make the game more interesting, Mizuguchi drew inspiration from the rhythm troope Stomp; a particular piece which inspired him was a segment where a performer would have the audience copy their clapping, with the rhythm becoming more complex over time. Mizuguchi wanted to incorporate this into the game, combining it with a narrative and distinctive music. The rest of the team found it difficult to understand Mizuguchi's vision as they were confused by his wish for comedy to be a part of the game's style, so he hired a pantomime artist to school the team in physical comedy. The production team also went to a comedy workshop to practise miming and physical comedy routines to further inform their understanding of the game. The name of the game's aliens "Morolians" was a derivation of the surname of artist Mayumi Moro; it came about as the team often used her last name round the office. Moro found its use in the game funny.

A key aspect of the game was that while the gameplay involved shooting, Ulala never actually killed anyone, allowing the game to be approachable for a wider range of players. When pitching the gameplay in his design document, Mizuguchi distilled the basic cycle of effort and reward, then came up with a means of realising them in the game. To ensure the team fully understood the gameplay concept of matching button presses to music and character actions, all extraneous effects were stripped away, leaving a basic version the team could focus on. While some animations were created using motion capture, the rest were animated by hand. The vocalization "Chu" emerged during voice recording. The original word was "Shoot", but the actors had difficult pronouncing it using the necessary single syllable, resulting in the word being contracted and altered into its current form.

Ulala's motion capture actions were performed by Japanese dancer Nazu Nahoko. The Morolians' movements were scripted by the mime artist Mizuguchi hired to help the team during early production. The idea of streaming polygonal models over CGI movies was suggested by Yuta. They made use of ADX technology to synch the movement of models over the movies. The game content filled just over 99% of the Dreamcast GD-ROM disc. The space usage was attributed by Mizuguchi to the large amount of video and audio streaming used in the game. In hindsight, Mizuguchi cited the use of pre-rendered movies as a challenge to the team. Due to the amount of space used, some planned comedy segments had to be cut. An early tech demo was put together for the game; in this prototype version, the player character was a man, and only the most basic elements of its gameplay and theme were in place. A later version featured a prototype design for Ulala. The game's visual aesthetic of a "retro future" was present in that demo, and stayed throughout production. Influences on the characters and art design came from across the production team, with tastes ranging from Star Wars to Doraemon to Monty Python. Mizuguchi was inspired by the contrasting styles of orchestral music and science fiction setting used in Star Wars.

The character of Ulala was a collaborative creation, though much of her design was attributed to the game's art director Yumiko Miyabe. Ulala's early actions were deemed too "cool and stylish", and her overall movement too stiff. Her design was also adjusted several times so she would appeal to male gamers (who favored looks) and female gamers (who preferred personality). Another notable artist on the project was Jake Kazdal, who worked as a concept and model artist. Kazdal said that one of Ulala's key design inspirations was the titular lead of the 1970s science fiction film Barbarella. The art style continued to evolve from there, with the staff often laughing at the "sheer ridiculousness" of some later characters. Her costume's orange colour was a reference to the Dreamcast logo, and signified Sega's new direction.

Audio

Music
The music for Space Channel 5 was composed by Naofumi Hataya and Kenichi Tokoi of Sega's music label WaveMaster. Hayata also acted as sound director. The musical style, inspired by big band jazz of the 1950s and 60s, was one of the earliest elements to be decided upon. Hataya attributed the game's musical direction to Mizuguchi's guidance throughout production. The musical style changed with each stage, with later sections incorporating techno and trance. The in-game soundtrack mixed CD-quality music with midi sound samples. According to Hayata, one of the hardest aspects of music development was the variety of genres and fitting all the score onto the game disc. Music production ran simultaneously with the game's production, with the sound team at first using concept art and in-production gameplay. Late in development, the story caused a lot of additional work for the team. The final total of in-game music was estimated at 70 minutes.

The game's main theme was "Mexican Flyer", composed by Ken Woodman in 1966. Mizuguchi approached Woodman about using the theme. Woodman was surprised that someone wanted to use the theme for a video game. The use of "Mexican Flyer" in the game's early presentation video informed the direction of the music. Getting the rights to the track proved difficult, as the track was extremely obscure and had not been used in any media since its release. The ending theme "Pala Paya" used vocals performed by WaveMaster staff. A soundtrack album for the game was published by Marvelous Entertainment and distributed by VAP on February 21, 2000. The album featured 22 tracks, including a remix of "Mexican Flyer". Tracks from Space Channel 5 were included in the compilation album Space Channel 5 20th Anniversary: Gyungyun Selection by UMA on December 18, 2019.

Voice cast
Sega chose not to promote the game's voice cast. Most of the voice roles were taken by members of the game's staff. This was due to the team wanting full control of how characters were portrayed, and the need to do quick re-recording sessions. Ulala's voice actress was similarly pulled from Sega staff. According to Mizuguchi, the recording process was so strenuous and his demands so exacting that the actress was brought to tears. Journalist James Mielke attributed Ulala's voice to Mineko Okamura. Okamura later confirmed her role, saying her demo voice was kept in the final game after positive feedback from the press. Professionals Show Hayami and Kae Iida were hired for the roles of rival reporters Jaguar and Pudding respectively, with Iida originally being planned for the role of Ulala. Ulala was voiced in English by Apollo Smile, then a notable television personality.

A notable cameo was Michael Jackson himself, featuring in the game as the character "Space Michael". A long-term collaborator with and fan of Sega, Jackson was shown a near-finished version of the game by Sega staff member Shuji Utsumi. Jackson loved the game and wanted to be featured in it. Mizuguchi initially wanted to refuse the request as the game was only a month away from completion, but the team wanted to include Jackson so they substituted a Morolian-controlled NPC character for a model based on Jackson and added moves based on the singer's famous dance moves. Initially thinking Jackson would dislike it, Mizuguchi was surprised when Jackson approved, realising the pressures the team were under, and provided voice lines for the character.

Release
Space Channel 5 was first announced in the September 1999 Tokyo Game Show. Nahoko portrayed the character at live promotional events, including its TGS showings. The game was released in Japan on December 16, 1999. Sega pushed the game's release with heavy public promotions and an extensive launch event in Tokyo. The game was supported by several pieces of merchandise. In the US, Sega conducted a contest in Universal City, California titled Space Channel 5 Ulala-a-like Contest. The contestants were girls between the ages of 9 and 21 who would compete to who could resemble Ulala the best. The contestants were able to meet with Ulala portrayed by Kelly Preston and the winner won $500 and a Dreamcast.

The game's localization was handled by Sega, who approached it "with care and time". One of the key elements for the team was finding the right English voice for Ulala. When the dialogue was localized, there was little difference between regions beyond language-specific nuances. The music itself received little to no changes. The game released internationally in 2000; it was published in North America on June 4, and in Europe on October 8.

Following their exit from the console market, Sega began moving their franchises onto other systems including PS2; one of those franchises was Space Channel 5. The PS2 version released in Europe on March 15, 2002; and in Japan on December 12 of that year. In North America, the PS2 port was bundled with its sequel and published in the region by Agetec. This version released in North America on November 18. In Japan, the PS2 version has since become a rarity, fetching high resale prices.

A remake for the GBA titled Space Channel 5: Ulala's Cosmic Attack was also produced. This formed part of Sega's partnership with THQ to co-develop and co-publish several of their franchises to the platform. The port was co-developed by Art Co., Ltd and THQ. The game was re-created within the GBA hardware, with its music rendered using a midi score. The music was handled by Tsutomu Fuzawa. The game released as a Western exclusive in 2003; it was published on June 17 in North America, and September 12 in Europe.

Reception

Dreamcast
Upon its debut in Japan, the game met with low sales. During its first week, it sold through just over 44% of its stock with over 41,000 units. It eventually sold over 93,600 units in Japan, being among the region's top 40 best-selling Dreamcast titles. At a 2002 conference, the game was declared a success by its staff, finding a wide audience among both hardcore and casual gamers. In contrast during a 2005 interview, Mizuguchi said that the game was not a commercial success.

According to video game review aggregator GameRankings, the Dreamcast version earned a score of 84% based on 34 reviews. Japanese gaming magazine Famitsu gave the game a score of 29 points out of 40. Pat Garratt of Computer and Video Games gave the game a perfect score, calling it a unique game and "absolute must for every DC owner". The three reviewers for Electronic Gaming Monthly lauded the soundtrack and art design, but noted issues with its short length and occasional syncing issues. GamePro positively compared the gameplay and style to PaRappa the Rapper and Dragon's Lair, recommending it as a short and enjoyable experience while noting a lack of extras. GameSpots Jeff Gerstmann said Space Channel 5 was worth playing for its unconventional artstyle and music, with his main complaints being repetitive gameplay and lack of unlockables.

GameSpy called the game "a work of art in every sense of the word", praising the world and music and calling the game a testament to Sega's production skills; their one major problem was the simplistic gameplay style and lack of features beyond the campaign. IGN gave both the Japanese original (from Colin Williamson), and the Western release (by Anoop Gantayat) near-perfect scores, praising the experience while sharing criticisms with Electronic Gaming Monthly. USA Today said the game was "all about fun, and [Space Channel 5] delivers with a song." Entertainment Weekly said that "gamers of all ages undoubtedly will want to help Ulala get her groove back — if not get their hands on a pair of those boots." Next Generations Greg Orlando called the game "Beautiful and all-too-short".

The game was nominated for awards in four categories at the 1999 Japan Game Awards. It was also nominated in the "Animation" category at the Academy of Interactive Arts & Sciences ceremony in 2001. In anniversary retrospectives and lists of favorite Dreamcast titles from multiple websites including Gamasutra and IGN, Space Channel 5 has been remembered as one of the most unique titles on the system for its gameplay design and art direction. 1UP.com, in an article about Mizuguchi's work with United Game Artists, "highlight" on the Dreamcast and described as "unlike anything before it."

Space Channel 5 and Sega AM9 were nominated at the 2002 BAFTA Awards in the "Best Audio" category, losing to Luigi's Mansion.

PlayStation 2
The PS2 port met with a similar positive response, GameRankings gave the North American release a score of 79% based on 7 reviews; and Metacritic gave it a score of 79 out of a possible 100 from 16 reviews, indicating a "generally favorable" reception. Electronic Gaming Monthly said that the mixture of music and unique style gave the game "an infectious, addictive quality". GamePro called the Special Edition package "easily the best bargain for the PS2 this side of [Virtua Fighter 4: Evolution]". Game Informer called this version "a great package crammed with more value and personality than most rhythm games". Brad Shoemaker of GameSpot felt it was a great release due to its low price and having both the original and its sequel.

GameSpys Christian Nutt lauded the music and its lead character, in addition to the low price for the double game pack, but faulted its length and issues with the localization. GameZone recommended the package for fans of Dance Dance Revolution, and said gamers outside its target audience should try it due to its quality and enjoyability. Douglass Perry of IGN, comparing the game to its sequel that formed part of the package, felt that the first was the inferior game due to lacking the later additions and polishing. Paul Fitzpatrick of Official U.S. PlayStation Magazine felt that the original game's flaws were only exacerbated when contrasted with its sequel. Paul Fitzpatrick of PlayStation Official Magazine – UK enjoyed the soundtrack and lauded its sense of style, but criticized its length.

Game Boy Advance
By contrast, the GBA port received a Metacritic score of 55 out of 100, showing "mixed or average" reviews. GamePro was surprised that the game worked on the portable console, praising the efforts of the team while being unable to recommend it to buyers. For Frank Provo of GameSpot, the biggest problem was the unresponsive controls, as otherwise the game was a laudable conversion of the game for the GBA. GameSpys Steve Steinberg was very critical, calling the game "a barely playable disappointment" despite liking the soundtrack. GameZone said that the difficulties with controlling Ulala and presentation made the game suitable only for hardcore series fans. Craig Harris, writing for IGN, said that while the gameplay was intact the other elements were undermined by the technical constraints of the console. The Village Voice gave the port a good score, saying that the game's core remained intact and enjoyable despite low graphical quality and control issues. Game Informer was also positive, saying that there could be no better version of Space Channel 5 on the platform. Nintendo Power gave praise to the control responses, but called the graphics "colorful but sparse".

Legacy

Sequels

A sequel to Space Channel 5 was planned from an early stage, but production was put on hold until Western sales figures came in. The sequel, Space Channel 5: Part 2, was announced in October 2001. It received a simultaneous release on Dreamcast and PS2 in January 2002 in Japan. The PS2 version released in mainland Europe the following year. In North America, the game was released as part of Space Channel 5: Special Edition by Agetec. It was the last game produced by United Game Artists prior to Sega's internal restructuring in 2003. Part 2 was later given a high-definition port to Microsoft Windows, Xbox 360 and PlayStation 3. It released first as part of the Dreamcast Collection in February 2011, then as a standalone digital release in October the same year.

While concepts existed for a third game in the series and pitches were made for the Wii and Kinect, the team felt they had exhausted their ideas, and Sega showed little interest in a new entry. At one time, Mizuguchi and Q Entertainment were in discussions with Sega about reviving the series for HD consoles. A new virtual reality project was eventually greenlit by Sega. The project was developed by Grounding Inc., a game company founded by former Sega developers including Okamura, who pitched the concept to Sega. Beginning in 2016 as an experimental collaboration with Sega and KDDI titled Space Channel 5 VR: Ukiuki Viewing Show, the project saw a strong fan response for a full game. Titled Space Channel 5 VR: Kinda Funky News Flash, the player takes the role of novice reporters assisting Ulala during a new invasion report. Originally scheduled for release on PlayStation VR, SteamVR, HTC Vive and Oculus Quest during December 2019, the game was delayed into the following year to improve its quality. All versions released between February and November 2020.

Additional media and cameos
Ulala was used in a collaboration between MTV and Sega to present the "Best Video" award at MTV Video Music Award ceremony. Ulala's appearance at the event was also used to promote SegaNet during its Dreamcast debut. A CGI television adaptation of Space Channel 5 was originally planned from SuperMega Media. In addition, Ulala was to have featured on the MTV program slot as an announcer. These MTV collaborations were cancelled mid-production. A film adaptation of the series was announced in August 2022. A collaboration between Sega and Erik Feig's Picturestart company, the script is being co-written by Barry Battles and Nir Paniry.

Sega's Sonic Team studio also created a mobile application called Ulala's Channel J for Japanese Vodafone devices in July 2001. The application was made up of up several minigames, most themed after the series and specifically Space Channel 5: Part 2. Some featured 3D graphics that required higher-specification devices to play. Themed mobile wallpapers and jingles were also included for download. The game shut down in September 2005, with some of its content merged to the Sonic Cafe mobile service.

In 2001, Palisades Toys produced themed merchandise; these included a lunch box, and figures of game characters including boss characters Evila, Pudding, the Morolians, and several variants of Ulala. Japanese action figure company Figma produced two Ulala figures based on her main looks from Space Channel 5 and its sequel in 2017. United Game Artists' next game Rez featured the Morolian character as a secret playable character. Ulala was featured as a secret character in racing game Sonic Riders, a playable character in multiple entries in the Sega All-Stars series (alongside Pudding and Blib), part of a themed stage in the Wii re-release of the rhythm game Samba de Amigo, and a playable unit in the crossover strategy game Project X Zone and its sequel.

Lawsuit
In 2003, Space Channel 5 and its protagonist Ulala was the subject of a lawsuit against Sega from Kierin Magenta Kirby; the lawsuit alleged that Sega approached her about licensing her likeness and music, but after she refused they used those elements anyway. During the lawsuit, Sega was able to show that the game was released in Japan the year before Kier stated that she was contacted by Sega about using her likeness, and that the developers had never heard of either Kier or her music. The case lasted until 2006, when the judge ruled in favour of Sega and Kier lost her appeal. She was obliged to pay Sega's legal fees of $608,000 (reduced from $763,000 on request).

References

Notes

Citations

External links
  
 
 

 
1999 video games
Agetec games
Dreamcast games
Game Boy Advance games
Michael Jackson-related games
Music video games
PlayStation 2 games
Sega Games franchises
Sega video games
Single-player video games
THQ games
Video games based on musicians
Video games developed in Japan
Video games featuring female protagonists